New is the second extended play (EP) by Australian rock band Regurgitator. The EP was released in August 1995 and peaked at number 30 on the ARIA singles chart.

At the ARIA Music Awards of 1996, it was nominated for ARIA Award for Highest Selling Single.

Singles
The EP was supported by two promotional/radio singles "Track 1" and "Blubber Boy"; both of which had video clips; however, no official single was commercially released. "Blubber Boy" polled at number 17 on the Triple J Hottest 100, 1995.

Track listing
 "Track 1" - 2:48
 "Power Tool" - 2:04
 "Blubber Boy" - 2:35
 "Gravey" - 3:19
 "7'10"" - 9:34

Charts

Release history

References

1995 EPs
EPs by Australian artists
Regurgitator albums
East West Records EPs
Reprise Records EPs